Ben Collins and Luke Piotrowski are an American film screenwriting and executive producing team best known for their collaborations with director David Bruckner, including Siren (2016), The Night House (2020), and Hellraiser (2022).

Career 
In 2016, Collins and Piotrowski began their writing career by drafting the screenplay for Siren. In 2017, they scripted the horror film Super Dark Times, which was given a wide release. In the same year, they wrote the script for Stephanie. In October 2012, it was revealed that the screenplay for Stephanie had been included in the 2012 Blood List of the year's best unproduced horror scripts in Hollywood.

In October 2018, they co-executive produced the horror film Boo!, which premiered at the Brooklyn Horror Film Festival. In 2019, they gained notability from writing the screenplay and story for The Night House, which was theatrically released in 2021, to critical acclaim. In 2020, they wrote the script and story for the 2022 horror film Hellraiser.

Filmography

References

External links 
 
 

21st-century American male writers
21st-century American screenwriters
American male screenwriters
Living people
Place of birth missing (living people)
Screenwriting duos
Year of birth missing (living people)